Events in the year 1545 in Norway.

Incumbents
Monarch: Christian III

Events
 The cathedral chapter at St Mary's Church was dissolved.

Arts and literature

Births
1 April – Peder Claussøn Friis, author (died 1614)

Deaths
Hans Glaser, bergmeister (b. c. 1480)
Hans Rev, bishop (b. c. 1489)

References